Gian-Piero Meade (born 19 March 1996) is an Italian cricketer. He played for the Italy national cricket team in the 2016 ICC World Cricket League Division Four tournament in October 2016.

In May 2019, he was named in Italy's squad for their Twenty20 International (T20I) series against Germany in the Netherlands. He made his T20I debut for Italy against Germany on 25 May 2019. The same month, he was named in Italy's squad for the Regional Finals of the 2018–19 ICC T20 World Cup Europe Qualifier tournament in Guernsey.

In November 2019, he was named in Italy's squad for the Cricket World Cup Challenge League B tournament in Oman. He made his List A debut, for Italy against Kenya, on 3 December 2019. In September 2021, he was named in Italy's T20I squad for the Regional Final of the 2021 ICC Men's T20 World Cup Europe Qualifier tournament.

References

External links
 

1996 births
Living people
Italian cricketers
Italy Twenty20 International cricketers
Place of birth missing (living people)
South African emigrants to Italy
Italian sportspeople of African descent